The Malagasy lapwing (Vanellus madagascariensis) is an extinct type of wader/shorebird, in the lapwing family.

Evidence of existence
It is known only from two subfossil humeri, found in separate locales in south-western Madagascar, which were described by Steven M. Goodman.

Estimated time of extinction
Radiocarbon dating has indicated that the species became extinct in the 14th century, during a period of climatic aridification.

References 

Vanellus
Extinct birds of Madagascar
Birds described in 1997
Fossil taxa described in 1997
Holocene extinctions